Work It Out may refer to:
 "Work It Out", a song by TJ Davis for Sonic R
 Work It Out (album), an album by Caroline's Spine
 "Work It Out" (Beyoncé song)
 "Work It Out" (Def Leppard song)
 "Work It Out" (Jurassic 5 song)
 "Work It Out" (Karizma song)
 "Work It Out" (Steve "Silk" Hurley song)
 "Work It Out!", a song by Kumi Koda from Best: Third Universe/Universe
 "Work It Out", a song by Misia from Just Ballade
 "Work It Out", a song by Q-Tip from The Renaissance
 "Work It Out", a song by Monie Love from the Boyz n the Hood soundtrack
 "Work It Out", a song by Shiva
 "Work It Out", a song by A-Trak

See also 
 Work It out with Chet Atkins C.G.P., an album by Chet Atkins
 Working It Out, a 1990 American TV sitcom
 We Can Work It Out (disambiguation)